Winnepesaukee can refer to:

 the Winnipesaukee Indians, a subtribe of the Pennacook people
 Lake Winnipesaukee, the largest lake in the U.S. state of New Hampshire
 the Winnipesaukee River